David Arnason (born 23 May 1940) is a Canadian author and poet of Icelandic heritage from Winnipeg, Manitoba.

Life
Born in Gimli, Manitoba, Arnason is of Icelandic descent and often writes about the Icelandic community in Canada. He is the son of Baldwin and Gudrun Arnason and the eldest of seven children. He attended the University of Manitoba where he received a B.A. (1961), a Certificate in Education (1963) and M.A. (1969), and has a PhD from the University of New Brunswick (1983-1984).
Arnason co-founded the Journal of Canadian Fiction with John Moss at the University of New Brunswick in 1972.

He was one of the co-founders of Queenston House Press in Winnipeg and has been an editor of Turnstone Press in Winnipeg since 1975. He was chairman of the Literary Press Group and a member of the executive of the Association of Canadian Publishers. He served on the Manitoba Arts Council 1985–1987. He was a general editor of the Macmillan Themes in Canadian Literature series. He has been a member of the advisory board of Anansi Press. He began working for the CBC in the early 1970s; he has reviewed books and theatre, as well as created various radio adaptations. He has written short stories, poetry, and novels, fiction and non-fiction. He edited Dorothy Livesay's Right Hand, Left Hand.

He has taught at the University of Manitoba since 1973 and was the head of the English Department from 1997 to 2006. He was Acting Head of the Department of Icelandic, at the University of Manitoba from 1998 to 2006. As of 2018 he is a full professor at the University of Manitoba and chair of both the Icelandic and the English departments. The University of Manitoba Archives and Special Collections hold the David Arnason Fonds, which includes manuscripts and correspondence.

Works
1980: Marsh Burning 
1981: The Icelanders 
1982: Fifty Stories and a Piece of Advice 
1984: The Circus Performers' Bar 
1987: Skrag 
1989: The Happiest Man in the World and Other Stories 
1992: The Pagan Wall 
1994: The Dragon and the Dry Goods Princess 
1994: The New Icelanders: A North American Community 
1995: If Pigs Could Fly 
2001: King Jerry 
2002: The Demon Lover 
2005: The Imagined City: A Literary History of Winnipeg Edited by David Arnason & Mhari Mackintosh,  – The Imagined City won both The Carol Shields Winnipeg Book Award and The Mary Scorer Book Award for best book by a Manitoba publisher in 2005.
2010: Baldur's Song: A Saga

See also

Canadian literature
Canadian poetry
List of Canadian poets
List of Canadian writers

References

External links 
"“The fiction that makes us real”: Playful Accreditation in David Arnason's “The Sunfish”", JSSE, Héliane Ventura
"Icelanders in North America:A Bibliography", Patrick J. Stevens, 17 June 1994

1940 births
Canadian male novelists
20th-century Canadian poets
20th-century Canadian male writers
Canadian male poets
Canadian people of Icelandic descent
Living people
Writers from Winnipeg
People from Gimli, Manitoba
20th-century Canadian novelists
21st-century Canadian novelists
21st-century Canadian poets
21st-century Canadian male writers